Germain Joseph Hallez (1769–1840) was a Belgian painter.

1769 births
1840 deaths
Belgian painters